"La-La-La" (alternatively known as "La-La-La (Excuse Me Miss Again)") is a song by American hip hop recording artist Jay-Z. It was released as the second single from the Bad Boys II soundtrack and makes an appearance on Blueprint 2.1. The song is a sequel to Jay-Z's "Excuse Me Miss".

2003 songs
2003 singles
Jay-Z songs
Bad Boy Records singles
Universal Records singles
Songs written by Jay-Z
Songs written by Pharrell Williams
Song recordings produced by the Neptunes
Songs written for films
Sequel songs
Bad Boys (franchise)